In film, specifically animation, a leica reel (also known as story reel or animatic) is a type of storyboarding device used in the production of potential series or features. Unlike actual storyboards or pitches, leica reels (when made) are used later in the development process, usually after voice actors have been hired and recorded, and thus are not used for selling or marketing the project. The term "leica reel" is derived from the German camera brand " Leica"  initially used to develop these filmed storyboards.

A leica reel is made from animated stills, or sometimes preliminary artwork or storyboard frames, arranged with recorded material. The specific recorded material used can occasionally be the entire soundtrack of the film, where sound editing has already occurred, though in many cases it is only the vocal soundtrack (in various states of completion) along with a selection of sound effects.

See also
Storyboard

References

Cinematic techniques
Animation techniques